Doctor Victor is a Czech rock trio formed in Prague in 2012. The band consists of Victor on vocals and lead guitar, Al on bass, and Tom on drums. Doctor Victor's music is based primarily on the legacy of traditional rock from the late 1960s and early 1970s, with elements of blues music.

In 2016, they released their debut album, 1st Prescription. The band's 2018 single "StandUP" was included in the Czech selection for the Eurovision Song Contest.

History

Founding and early days: 2012–15
Doctor Victor was founded in 2012 by Victor, a graduate of the Jaroslav Ježek Conservatory in Prague and holder of a scholarship at the Berklee College of Music in Boston. The band won the Hard Rock Rising 2013 contest in Czechia as well as the  Czech Global Battle of the Bands contest in 2014. In the contest's worldwide finals in Chiang Mai, Thailand, the band placed second.
In April 2014, they were on the cover of the Czech music magazine Muzikus, and their single "Beautiful Age" got into the top 70 rock songs in the Unsigned Only Music Competition in the United States in 2015. They continued to perform, opening for popular Czech bands such as Lucie and Chinaski.

Debut album, touring, and Eurovision Song Contest: 2016–18
Doctor Victor's debut album, 1st Prescription, was released on 21 March 2016 and two months later, they were chosen by AC/DC as their support band for the Prague show of their Rock or Bust World Tour. In February 2017, they launched their first official tour, named Music Is My Drug Tour, at clubs and festivals across Czechia. In May, they were on the cover of the magazine Rock & All. In the summer of 2017, they performed in the United Kingdom for the first time, playing six cities, including London. In October, the band revealed that they would be collaborating on the upcoming solo album of Dan McCafferty, original lead singer of Nazareth. The album, titled Last Testament, was released in 2019 and featured Doctor Victor on the track "My Baby".

The band's single "StandUP" was released in January 2018, together with an announcement of its inclusion in the Czech national selection for the Eurovision Song Contest. The song was chosen out of more than 400 submissions from all over the world. Doctor Victor went back on tour in 2018 and travelled to the UK as well as other European countries, including Germany, the Netherlands, and Austria. After finishing their summer tour, they were selected among the top ten semi-finalists in the KISS KRUISE 2018 competition. Also in 2018, the band opened for The Dead Daisies in Prague.

2019–present
In 2019, the band toured the UK and USA, performing at the NAMM Show in California, among other venues and events.

Band members
 Victor – vocals, lead guitar
 Muddy – bass guitar, vocals
 Karpa – drums, vocals

Discography
 1st Prescription (2016)

References

External links
 

Czech rock music groups
Musical groups established in 2012
2012 establishments in the Czech Republic